The Football Tournament was a Danish football tournament played 14 times in the years 1889–1903. The tournament was played under the auspices of the Danish Football Association, and was contested by the best Danish teams of its time. The winners are not considered official Danish champions.

Winners

Championships by club

Footnotes

See also 

 List of association football competitions

References 

 
Defunct football leagues in Denmark
Den